The Maduru Oya is a major stream in the North Central Province of Sri Lanka. Its catchment area receives approximately 3,060 million cubic metres of rain per year, and approximately 26 percent of the water reaches the sea. It has a catchment area of 1,541 square kilometres.

See also 
 List of dams and reservoirs in Sri Lanka
 List of rivers of Sri Lanka

References 

Rivers of Sri Lanka